Annika Lott (born 7 December 1999) is a German female handball player for Buxtehuder SV and the German national team.

She represented Germany at the 2020 European Women's Handball Championship.

References

External links

1999 births
Living people
People from Henstedt-Ulzburg
German female handball players
Sportspeople from Schleswig-Holstein